Abedallah Shelbayh (also known as Abdullah Shelbayh; born 16 November 2003) is a Jordanian tennis player.

Shelbayh has a career-high ATP singles ranking of 276 achieved on 20 February 2023, and is the first Jordanian tennis player to achieve a world rank. He also has a career-high ATP doubles ranking of 927, achieved on 8 November 2021. He has a career-high ITF juniors ranking of 27 achieved on 12 July, 2021. Shelbayh has won 3 ITF singles titles and 2 doubles titles on the ITF Men's Circuit. 

Shelbayh represents Jordan at the Davis Cup, where he has a win-loss record of 10–1.

Career

2022: Top 500, Turned professional 
In September 2022, Shelbayh reached the semifinals of the Manacor Challenger after receiving a wildcard into the main draw, defeating the No. 1 seed and world No. 127 Dominic Stricker in his opening match. Following this run, Shelbayh made his debut in the world's top 500. 

On December 1, 2022, after one year as part of the Florida Gators men's tennis team at the University of Florida, Shelbayh announced that he would forego his remaining collegiate eligibility in order to turn professional. The following week, Shelbayh won his third ITF singles title in Trnava, Slovakia, defeating Daniel Rincón in the final.

On December 28, 2022, Shelbayh won the second edition of the Arab Masters Tennis Tournament, held in Kuwait City, defeating Benjamin Hassan in the final. In addition to prize money of $25,000, the win gave Shelbayh a wildcard to compete in the main draw of the 2023 Qatar Open in Doha.

2023: Historic maiden Challenger final, top 300 & ATP debuts

In February, Shelbayh qualified for the 2023 Tenerife Challenger III. He defeated Salvatore Caruso in his opening main draw match, before losing to Ryan Peniston in the second round. The following week, Shelbayh reached his second career semifinal on the ATP Challenger Tour at the 2023 Bahrain Ministry of Interior Tennis Challenger, defeating the No. 1 seed and world No. 79 Jason Kubler in the quarterfinals. In the semifinals, he again defeated lucky loser Salvatore Caruso, becoming the first Jordanian player in history and the youngest Arab to reach a final at Challenger level. Shelbayh was defeated by Thanasi Kokkinakis in the final. As a result of this run, Shelbayh moved up more than 120 positions in ranking, entering the top 300 for the first time at world No. 276 on 20 February 2023.

Shelbayh made his ATP Tour-level main draw debut at the 2023 Qatar ExxonMobil Open, where he received a wildcard. He lost to Kwon Soon-woo in the first round in three sets.

ATP Challenger and ITF World Tennis Tour finals

Singles: 5 (3–2)

Doubles 4 (2–2)

Junior Grand Slam finals

Doubles: 1 (1 runner-up)

References

External links
 
 
 

2003 births
Living people
Jordanian male tennis players
Florida Gators men's tennis players